Prunus × hillieri is the result of a cross between Prunus incisa (Fuji cherry) and Prunus sargentii (hill cherry). The most famous cultivar is 'Spire', which was developed from a sport discovered growing in Hillier and Sons nursery of Winchester. It is regularly used as a street tree. In 1993 'Spire' won the Royal Horticultural Society's Award of Garden Merit.

References

hillieri
Hybrid prunus
Interspecific plant hybrids
Cherry blossom
Ornamental plant cultivars
Ornamental trees